Moniac is an unincorporated community situated along the St. Marys River, in southern Charlton County in the U.S. state of Georgia. Part of the "Georgia Bend" (the "tail" of Georgia that protrudes farther south than the rest of the state), the area was an early trading post in the 1820s as the last outpost before crossing into the Florida territory. To protect the settlement from Indian raids, a fort was built across the St. Marys from the settlement in 1838. The settlement's name comes from an Indian chief whose entrance trail to the Okefenokee Swamp passed nearby. The fort was dismantled in 1858.

Located near the Okefenokee Swamp, the area was evacuated in May 2007 during the Bugaboo scrub fire.

References

 http://ftp.rootsweb.com/pub/usgenweb/ga/history/med1904.txt
 http://www.firstcoastnews.com/news/news-article.aspx?storyid=81772

External links
 http://www.rootsweb.com/~flbaker/gene4.html

Unincorporated communities in Georgia (U.S. state)
Unincorporated communities in Charlton County, Georgia